Greatest Hits Live is a 1989 live album released by Diana Ross in the UK on the EMI label. The album saw Ross performing material from throughout her career, from The Supremes days up to several tracks from her recent album Workin' Overtime.

The album reached #34 in the UK album charts, and was certified Gold for sales in excess of 100,000 copies.

Track listing 
"Intro - Dirty Diana" - 1:24
"I'm Coming Out" (Bernard Edwards, Nile Rodgers) - 1:31
"Upside Down" (Edwards, Rodgers) - 2:26
"What Can One Person Do?" (Rodgers, Smith) - 2:28
"Missing You" (Lionel Richie) - 4:45
"Mirror Mirror" (Dennis Matkosky, Michael Sembello) - 3:49
"Chain Reaction" (Barry Gibb, Maurice Gibb, Robin Gibb) - 3:57
"Muscles" (Michael Jackson) - 3:37 
"Dirty Looks" (Scher, Golden) -  2:22 
"Love Hangover" (Marilyn McLeod, Pam Sawyer) - 2:51
"The Man I Love" (George Gershwin, Ira Gershwin) - 3:45 
"Do You Know Where You're Going To (Theme From Mahogany)" (Gerry Goffin, Michael Masser)  - 2:28
"Ain't No Mountain High Enough" (Nickolas Ashford, Valerie Simpson) - 2:55
"Paradise" (Rodgers, Smith) - 3:29
"This House" (Rodgers) - 4:03
"Workin' Overtime" (Rodgers) - 3:26 
"Supremes Medley" ("Baby Love"/"Stop! In the Name of Love"/"You Can't Hurry Love"/"You Keep Me Hangin' On"/"Love Is Like an Itching in My Heart") (Holland-Dozier-Holland) - 6:51
"Why Do Fools Fall in Love" (George Goldner, Frankie Lymon) - 3:11
"Endless Love" (Richie) - 4:16
"Reach Out and Touch (Somebody's Hand)" (Ashford, Simpson) - 3:44

Charts

Certifications

Personnel
Diana Ross - vocals
Bobby Glenn - background vocals
Kevin Chokan - guitar
Walt Fowler - trumpet, keyboards
David Goldblatt - keyboards, music direction
Rocq-E-Harrell - background vocals
John Pena - bass
Eric Persing - synthesizer programming
Ron Powell - percussion
Mark Ellis Stephens - keyboards
Steve Tavaglione - saxophone
Michael Warren - guitar

References

1989 live albums
Diana Ross live albums
EMI Records live albums